Lyda Hill (born 1942) is an American investor and philanthropist.

Early life
Lyda Hill was born on September 17, 1942 in Dallas, Texas. Her father was Albert Galatyn Hill Sr. (1904-1988) and her mother, Margaret Hunt Hill (1915-2007). Her maternal grandfather was H.L. Hunt (1889-1974).

She attended the Hockaday School, an all-girl boarding school in Dallas, from 1952 to 1960. She entered Stanford University in 1960, but soon left to attend Hollins University, a small liberal arts college for women in Virginia. She earned a degree in mathematics from Hollins in 1964 and received its Outstanding Alumnae Award in 2009.

Career
In 1967, at age 25, Lyda Hill launched Hill World Travel, a travel agency located in Dallas. She sold the company in 1982, by which time she had grown the company into the largest travel agency in the city and one of the largest in the country. A few years after starting her business, in 1970, she became President of Seven Falls, a tourist attraction near Colorado Springs, Colorado, where her family spent summers. 

She developed and constructed the Garden of the Gods Visitor and Nature Center in Colorado Springs in 1995 - designed to be free to the public while generating revenue through its retail operation to assist in maintaining Garden of the Gods Park.  In 2011, after the center had donated $3.5 million to the Garden of the Gods Foundation, Hill gave the Visitor Center to the Foundation.

Hill has donated extensively to a variety of organizations in the Dallas area and in Colorado. She has joined The Giving Pledge, initiated by Bill and Melinda Gates and Warren Buffett, and has pledged to donate her entire wealth to charity, the bulk of it during her lifetime.

Awards 
In 2015, Hill became the 18th recipient of the J. Erik Jonsson Ethics Award, given by the Southern Methodist University's McGuire Center. The award is given to individuals who "personify the spirit of moral leadership and public virtue."

Hill's work with the Garden of the Gods was recognized in 2019 when she received the Land Trust's Stuart P. Dodge Award, honoring a lifetime commitment to conservation. 

In 2022, Hill became the recipient of the Spirit of the Springs Lifetime Achievement Award, given by the City of Colorado Springs.

Lyda Hill Philanthropies 
Lyda Hill Philanthropies is a foundation that has achieved a number of charitable outcomes. The aim includes funding 'transformational advances in science and nature' and working with nonprofit organizations to improve the Texas and Colorado communities. 

Lyda Hill Philanthropies also includes the personal philanthropy of Hill.

References

People from Dallas
American philanthropists
Giving Pledgers
21st-century philanthropists
Living people
1942 births
Hollins University alumni
Hockaday School alumni
Hunt family